is a Japanese plant scientist and academic teaching at the University of Texas at Austin as of September 2019.

Career 
Torii researches stem cell maintenance and the cell-to-cell communication required to correctly pattern tissue during development, focusing on stomatal development as a model. Her work on cell-to-cell communication has also focused on the mechanisms that determine organ size and shape. In September 2019, Torii joined the faculty of the University of Texas at Austin, where she is a professor of molecular biosciences and holds the Johnson & Johnson Centennial Chair in Plant Cell Biology. She is also an Investigator at the Howard Hughes Medical Institute and a Principal Investigator and Visiting Professor at the World Premier Research Initiative, Institute of Transformative Biomolecules (WPI-ITbM), Nagoya University, Japan. Prior to joining the University of Texas at Austin, Torii was the Endowed Distinguished Professor of Biology at the University of Washington.

Early life 
Torii was born in Tokyo, Japan in 1965. She completed her B.S. (1987) and M.S. (1989) degrees in Biochemistry and Biophysics at the Institute of Biological Sciences at University of Tsukuba, Japan. She also obtained a PhD (1993) from the University of Tsukuba, researching seed development in carrots.

Positions 

 Professor, Department of Molecular Biosciences, University of Texas at Austin . 2019– 
 Oversea Principal Investigator and Visiting Professor, Institute of Transformative Biomolecules, Nagoya University, Japan  2013–  
 Investigator, Howard Hughes Medical Institute  2011–  
 Endowed Distinguished Professor of Biology, University of Washington 2011–2019 
 Professor, Department of Biology, University of Washington 2009– 
 PRESTO Researcher, Japan Science and Technology Agency 2008–2012 
 Affiliate Faculty, University of Washington Institute of Stem Cell and Regenerative Medicine 2006– 
 Associate Professor, Department of Biology, University of Washington 2005–2009 
 Assistant Professor, Department of Biology, University of Washington 2002–2005

Awards and honors

 2008 – JSPS prize for 'Mechanisms of Stomatal Patterning and Differentiation in Plants' 
 2012 – Fellow of the American Association for the Advancement of Science (AAAS) 
2015 – Saruhashi Prize
2021 – Asahi Prize

Publications

References 

20th-century Japanese botanists
Living people
University of Texas at Austin faculty
University of Washington faculty
Women botanists
Academics from Tokyo
Japanese emigrants to the United States
1965 births
University of Tsukuba alumni
21st-century Japanese botanists